Grant Earl Mouser Jr. (February 20, 1895 – December 21, 1943) was a U.S. Representative from Ohio for two terms from 1929 to 1933.

He was the son of Grant E. Mouser, who also served as a United States congressman from Ohio.

Biography 
Born in Marion, Ohio, Mouser attended the public schools and Ohio Wesleyan University at Delaware in 1913 and 1914.
He was graduated from the law college of Ohio State University at Columbus in 1917 and was admitted to the bar the same year.
During the First World War was graduated from the Army Medical School at Washington, D.C., in 1918, and served in the United States Army as a second lieutenant in the Medical Corps with the Western Reserve University College Ambulance Unit.
He commenced the practice of law in Marion, Ohio, in 1920.
City solicitor of Marion 1924–1927, resigning to become special counsel in the office of the Ohio Attorney General, and served in this capacity until 1929.
He also served as attorney for the State highway department in 1927 and 1928.

Congress 
Mouser was elected as a Republican to the Seventy-first and Seventy-second Congresses (March 4, 1929 – March 3, 1933).
He was an unsuccessful candidate for reelection in 1932 to the Seventy-third Congress and for election in 1936 to the Seventy-fifth Congress.

Later career and family life
He continued the practice of law until his death in Marion, Ohio, December 21, 1943.
He was interred in Marion Cemetery.

Mouser Jr. married Hilda Gorham in Marion, Ohio on November 7, 1918.

Mouser Jr. was a Mason, Elk, and member of Methodist Episcopal Church, American Legion, Phi Gamma Delta and Phi Delta Phi.

References

Sources

1895 births
1943 deaths
People from Marion, Ohio
United States Army officers
Ohio Wesleyan University alumni
Ohio State University Moritz College of Law alumni
United States Army personnel of World War I
20th-century American politicians
Republican Party members of the United States House of Representatives from Ohio